Ivan Villalba (born 19 January 1995 in Paraguay) is a Paraguayan footballer who now plays for Club Sol de América in his home country.

Career

Villalba started his senior career with Club Libertad. After that, he played for Imbabura S.C., Manta, Club Rubio Ñú, and Peñarol. In 2018, he signed for Club Sol de América in the Paraguayan Primera División, where he has made eighty-nine appearances and scored four goals.

References

External links 
 To the limit
 Villalba: "I arrived at the biggest club"
 "We are not just going to participate, we are going for the sixth cup," said Iván Villalba
 Paraguayan defender Villalba does not want to return to Manta

1995 births
Living people
Paraguayan footballers
Paraguayan expatriate footballers
Club Rubio Ñu footballers
Peñarol players
Club Sol de América footballers
Manta F.C. footballers
Imbabura S.C. footballers
Cobresal footballers
Association football defenders
Expatriate footballers in Chile
Expatriate footballers in Colombia
Expatriate footballers in Ecuador
Expatriate footballers in Uruguay